Artur Patek (born 1965) is a Polish historian at the , specializing in 20th century Polish-Jewish-Soviet history as well as the history of Polish film.

References 

1965 births
21st-century Polish historians
Polish male non-fiction writers
Living people
20th-century Polish historians
Academic staff of Jagiellonian University